Louis Clark de Rochemont (January 13, 1899 – December 23, 1978) was an American film maker known for creating, along with Roy E. Larsen, the monthly  theatrically shown newsreels The March of Time. His brother, Richard, was also a producer and writer on The March of Time.

The de Rochemonts were descended from Huguenot ancestors who settled in New Hampshire early in the nineteenth century. Born in 1899, the son of a Boston attorney, he grew up in small-town Massachusetts. His film career began when, still a teenager, he filmed his New England neighbors and sold the footage to local theatres under the  title See Yourself as Others See You.

The newsreels he created defined film news from 1935–51. The 20-minute films, which combined filmed news with interpretive interviews and dramatizations, appeared between featured films in theaters. When he moved from newsreels to feature films, de Rochemont chose to produce films based on real stories in actual locations, often with locals in the cast. After three spy films that helped define film noir, including The House on 92nd Street (1945), he produced a wide array of feature films such as the semi-documentary Boomerang (1947).

He has been called the "father of the docu-drama."  His early documentary productions won 2 Academy Awards. Windjammer (1958) was produced by de Rochemont and directed by his son, Louis de Rochemont III. The elder Rochemont also produced The Roman Spring of Mrs. Stone (1962).

In March 1951, de Rochemont's production company purchased the animated film rights to George Orwell's Animal Farm, and de Rochemont was heavily involved in the artistic direction of the animated film. De Rochemont's firm acted as a "front" for the Central Intelligence Agency, the actual funder/producer of this film.

References

External links
Louis De Rochemont papers at the University of Wyoming – American Heritage Center

1899 births
1978 deaths
Film producers from Massachusetts
Businesspeople from Boston
20th-century American businesspeople